Downer is the New Jersey state soil. The Downer has four soil horizons:

Surface layer: dark grayish brown loamy sand
Subsurface layer: grayish brown sandy loam
Subsoil - upper: yellowish brown gravelly sandy loam
Subsoil - lower: yellowish brown sand and coarse sand

The Downer Series was established in 1960 in Gloucester County. Downer soils are formed in fluviomarine deposits in the Northern Atlantic Coastal Plains.

See also
Pedology (soil study)
List of U.S. state soils

References

USDA Natural Resources Conservation Service State Soils New Jersey (PDF)

Pedology
Soil in the United States
Geology of New Jersey
Symbols of New Jersey
Types of soil